Sandy Smith may refer to:

 Sandy Smith (British Army officer) (1922–1993)
 Sandy Smith (cricketer), Irish cricketer born 1945
 Sandy Smith (politician), American politician
 Sandy Smith (visual artist), Scottish visual artist born 1983